1687 Glarona is a stony Themis asteroid approximately 34 kilometers in diameter from the outer region of the asteroid belt. It was discovered by Swiss astronomer Paul Wild at Zimmerwald Observatory near Bern, Switzerland, on 19 September 1965. It was later named after the Swiss Canton of Glarus.

Orbit and classification 

The asteroid is a member of the Themis family, one of the larger groups in the outer main-belt. It orbits the Sun at a distance of 2.6–3.7 AU once every 5 years and 7 months (2,049 days). Its orbit has an eccentricity of 0.18 and an inclination of 3° with respect to the ecliptic. The first precovery was taken at Heidelberg Observatory in 1909, extending the asteroid's observation arc by 56 years prior to its discovery.

Naming 

The minor planet was named for of the discoverer's home valley, the Swiss Canton of Glarus and its capital Glarus. Paul Wild (1925–2014) was a prolific discoverer almost 100 asteroids, and is well known for his discovery of comet Wild 2, which was visited by NASA's Stardust mission. The official  was published by the Minor Planet Center on 1 October 1969.

Physical characteristics

Lightcurves 

A rotational lightcurve obtained in the 1970s gave a well-defined rotation period of 6.3 hours with a brightness amplitude of 0.75 in magnitude. In March 2016, a second period was published based on data from the Lowell Photometric Database (LPD). Using lightcurve inversion and convex shape models, as well as distributed computing power and the help of individual volunteers, a period of  hours could be obtained for this asteroid from the LPD's sparse-in-time photometry data.

Diameter and albedo 

According to the space-based surveys carried out by the Infrared Astronomical Satellite IRAS, the Japanese Akari satellite, and NASA's Wide-field Infrared Survey Explorer with its subsequent NEOWISE mission, the asteroid measures between 31.5 and 42.0 kilometers in diameter and its surface has an albedo in the range of 0.0795 to 0.141.

The Collaborative Asteroid Lightcurve Link (CALL) gives preference to the results obtained by IRAS with an albedo of 0.1219 and a diameter of 33.93 kilometers. CALL also classifies the Themistian asteroid as a stony S-class body, which are otherwise known to have low albedos, showing spectra of carbonaceous C-type bodies (also see Carbonaceous chondrites).

Notes

References

External links 
 Asteroid Lightcurve Database (LCDB), query form (info )
 Dictionary of Minor Planet Names, Google books
 Asteroids and comets rotation curves, CdR – Observatoire de Genève, Raoul Behrend
 Discovery Circumstances: Numbered Minor Planets (1)-(5000) – Minor Planet Center
 
 

001687
001687
Discoveries by Paul Wild (Swiss astronomer)
Named minor planets
19650919